Awaragira is a 1990 Sri Lankan drama film directed by Lester James Peries and produced by Dilman Jayaratne for Dil Films. This film was based on the novel 'Awaragira' by G.B. Senanayake. It stars Joe Abeywickrama, Iranganie Serasinghe and Tony Ranasinghe in lead roles along with Lucky Dias and Vasanthi Chathurani. Music composed by Premasiri Khemadasa. It is the 836th Sri Lankan film in the Sinhala cinema. The film was released from May 14 to 27, 2004 at the Regal in Colombo and nine other CEL circuit cinemas for a short release.

Cast
 Joe Abeywickrama as K.B. Sethigala
 Tony Ranasinghe as Ranbanda
 Iranganie Serasinghe as Dingiri Menike
 Kamal Addararachchi as Dayaweera
 Sanoja Bibile as Vinitha
 Vasanthi Chathurani as Vasantha
 Lucky Dias as Wickrama
 Rathna Lalani Jayakody as Seetha
 Samanthi Lanerole as Vinitha's mother
 Swarna Mallawarachchi
 Ranjan Ramanayake as Priyankara
 Leena de Silva as Kusuma
 Bandula Suriyabandara as Vinitha's father
 Susila Kottage as Asilin, Vinitha's servant

Plot
K.B.Sethigala and Dingiri Menike are husband and wife respectively. Mr. Sethigala has an issue with Ranbanda since long ago because Ranbanda's father had claimed Sethigala's house. As a result, Sethigala had to leave their house. Ranbanda's family moves to Kandy, the city where Sethigala lives. Dayaweera informs about this but Sethigala does not show pleasure about that. Dayaweera, Priyankara are Sethigala's Elder and younger son respectively. Vasantha is his only daughter. Dayaweera develops a relationship with Ranbanda's daughter Seetha and marries her. After that Priyankara develops a relationship with Vinitha who is a daughter of an ASP. Priyankara is a university student. Dayaweera is an Engineer. Sethigala is an entrepreneur. Ranbanda introduces Wickrama to Sethigala at a party. Wickrama becomes interested in Seeta. Sethigala invites Wickrama to help him with his business work.

Wickrama had moved from Rathnapura to Kandy so that is the reason he came to the party. He had had a relationship with Seetha in the past. He has a bad reputation when he was in Rathnapura. Seetha had refused to marry him. Vinitha has had a relationship with a guy in her neighbourhood but she got married with Priyanakara because her parents persuaded her. Seetha is angry with Wickrama so she comes to live at Sethigala's home with Dayaweera. She also carries plans so that Sethigala excludes Wickrama from his businesses. Wickrama does not care about Vasantha and neglects her. So Vasantha develops a mental illness. One day Vinitha had written a letter and runs out from her house to escape with the aforementioned guy who she had a previous relationship but she comes back because he refused to marry her. Dingiri Menike sees the letter and reads it and gets to know about what has happened. She does not tell it to Priyankara as she thought it would create more trouble. Priyankara goes to the club to meet Wickrama there to request him to treat Vasantha well and Wickrama tells him about Vinitha. Priyankara goes home and asks Dingiri manike whether it is true or not. She admits it is true and Priyankara commits suicide by poisoning himself.

Vasantha gets to know about the incident and is heartbroken. One day she sees a coffin emerging from a wall of her bedroom. Next day her father comes to visit him. The final scene of the film is a meeting between Dayaweera, Vasantha and Wickrama. Vasantha accuses Wickrama for causing all the trouble and accuses him of spending money for other women that he has secret relationships with. Vasantha asks them to stop but Dayaweera kills Wickrama. Vasantha kills Dayaweera by stabbing him. The story ends with a scene of Sethigala and Dingiri Manike seated next to each other in their garden.

Awards

Sarasaviya Awards

|-
|| 1996 ||| Awaragira - Irangani Serasinghe || Best Actress || 
|-
|| 1996 ||| Awaragira - Vasanathi Chathurani || Best Supporting Actress || 
|-
|| 1996 ||| Awaragira || Best Art Director || 
|-
|| 1996 ||| Awaragira - Donald Karunaratne || Best Cameraman ||

References

External links
 

1990 films
1990s Sinhala-language films